Balgowlah is a suburb of northern Sydney, in the state of New South Wales, Australia. Balgowlah (or Bulgowlah) said to be an Aboriginal name for "North Harbour". The area now known as Balgowlah was known to the Aboriginals as Jilling.

Balgowlah is located 12 kilometres north-east of the Sydney central business district in the local government area of Northern Beaches Council, in the Northern Beaches region. Balgowlah shares the postcode 2093 with the adjacent suburbs of Manly Vale, Balgowlah Heights and North Balgowlah.

History
Balgowlah was named in 1832 after an Aboriginal word meaning north harbour in reference to its position from Port Jackson. In the early days of European Settlement it had been known as Little Manly. Sir Edmund Barton, Australia's first prime minister, resided in the building known as Whitehall in White Street. Since 2004, Whitehall has been the site of the Norwegian Seamen's Church.

Heritage listings
Balgowlah has a number of heritage-listed sites, including:
 83 Griffiths Street: Balgowlah Substation

Demographics
According to the 2016 census of population, there were 7,961 residents in Balgowlah. 63.3% of residents were born in Australia. The most common other countries of birth were England 9.5%, New Zealand 3.0% and South Africa 1.8%. 81.4% of residents spoke only English at home. The most common responses for religious affiliation were No Religion 37.4%, Catholic 23.7% and Anglican 17.1%.

Commercial area
Balgowlah's main commercial area is located on Condamine Street and Sydney Road. Major businesses in Balgowlah are Harvey Norman and Bunnings Warehouse. Stockland Balgowlah is a shopping centre located on Condamine Street. The centre opened on 15 July 2009. Its main majors are Coles, Fitness First and 62 other retailers. Stockland Balgowlah is built on the site of the historic Totem Centre, which opened in 1959. The name Totem was based on the North American model. The centre had 33 shops, a bowling alley and a huge Woolworths store. In 2007 the Totem Centre was demolished, the centre was run down at the time of its demolition and the Totem name was not continued. However, the centre is still colloquially referred to as "the Totem" or the "Totem Shopping Centre" in the area. The nearest major shopping centre is Westfield Warringah Mall, located 2 kilometres north of the suburb.

There are a few smaller shopping areas in Balgowlah, some of them the remnants of the traditional "corner shop" prior to the 1960s.

Transport
Balgowlah is one of the destinations for the Hop-Skip-Jump free bus service operated by Northern Beaches Council. Numerous public buses operated by Keolis Downer Northern Beaches also operate in the area, the majority coming through Balgowlah en route to Manly, Westfield Warringah Mall, Seaforth and the city.

Schools
Schools in the Balgowlah region include:
St. Cecilias Primary School
Balgowlah Heights Public School
Manly West Public School
Northern Beaches Secondary College Balgowlah Boys Campus

Parks and reserves
The North Harbour Reserve on Condamine Street, south of the shopping centre, is a popular picnic spot for large groups. The reserve is also on the scenic walk that runs from Manly through Fairlight, Balgowlah, Balgowlah Heights and Clontarf to The Spit, near the Spit Bridge.

Notable people 
 Wayne Jarratt – actor on stage and television
 Emma Jeffcoat – Australian triathlete
 Callan Mulvey – actor on television and film
 Jack Vidgen – singer

References

External links
  [CC-By-SA]

 
Suburbs of Sydney
Northern Beaches Council